Oliver James (born 26 October 1953) is a British psychologist, author, journalist, television producer and broadcaster.

Career

James was educated at Eton College and Magdalene College, Cambridge, graduating with a degree in Social Anthropology. He trained as a child clinical psychologist at the University of Nottingham, then worked for six years at the NHS Cassel Hospital in Richmond, London, in a clinical psychologist post. He is registered as a Relational Psychotherapist at the Bowlby Centre, and as a Chartered Psychologist at the British Psychological Society.

Speaking on Channel 4's 2013 "Psychopath Night", James described the credit crunch as a "mass outbreak of corporate psychopathy which resulted in something that very nearly crashed the whole world economy".

Reception of work
During his career in psychology, James has attracted controversy with his views on the nature versus nurture debate.

Stuart J. Ritchie, a psychologist at the University of Edinburgh, wrote a strongly critical review of James's book Not In Your Genes. He described the book as a "straw man made flesh", "a compendium of psychological myths and legends", and "bending over backwards to avoid awkward conclusions". Ritchie wrote, "Few books risk such damage to the public understanding of science as those by Oliver James", and accused James of "scientific illiteracy".

Ritchie described the book's thesis as "children are born with brains of soft clay, their mental makeup unaffected by genes and infinitely mouldable by their parents", and that "DNA has no effect on the mind or mental health, whereas parenting reigns supreme". Ritchie described a variety of evidence which contradicts this view.

Ritchie also responded to a letter from James in The Psychologist magazine, following which James and Prof Richard Bentall of the University of Liverpool engaged him in argument.

James responded to Ritchie's criticisms in an article in The Guardian in March 2016.

Works

Television

James produced The Last Day episode of the Channel 4 documentary short TV series Short Stories, which was released on the 1 June 1990. It documented The Mail on Sunday on their final day working at Fleet Street.

James co-produced the Wot U Lookin At? (also known as Wot You Lookin At?) episode of Horizon with David Malone, which was released on the 24 May 1993. It looks at the reasons for why men are seemingly violent, and why violence seems to be on the increase.

James produced the Prozac Diary special episode of The Late Show, which was broadcast on the 1 May 1995. It was broadcast as part of the States of Mind season. It follows the creative artists Michael Bracewell, Alice Thomas Ellis, Alan Jenkins, and Bernard Sumner, over 4 weeks to see if or how the Prozac that they've been given to take, affects their creativity.

James produced and presented the 7 episode talk show The Chair for BBC Two. It was first broadcast on the 21 May 1997, starting with Vanessa Feltz as the first guest. The other 6 guests included: Paul McKenna, Peter Mandelson, Patsy Palmer, Julian Clary, David Icke, and George Graham.

Books

 

 

 

 

 

 

 

 

 

 James, Oliver (2016), Upping Your Ziggy: How David Bowie Faced His Childhood Demons - and How You Can Face Yours, Karnac Books,

See also 
 Affluenza
 Attention deficit hyperactivity disorder controversies
 Narcissism in the workplace
 Machiavellianism in the workplace
 Psychopathy in the workplace

References

External links
 Author website
 Bloomsbury author page
 
 
 

Living people
English psychologists
English television presenters
British documentary filmmakers
Alumni of the University of Nottingham
Alumni of Magdalene College, Cambridge
People educated at Eton College
The School of Life people
1953 births